Vandam Street is a street in the Hudson Square neighborhood of Lower Manhattan in New York City. It runs east to west from Sixth Avenue to Greenwich Street.


History 
On August 16, 1966, the New York City Landmarks Preservation Commission designated 9–29 Vandam Street as part of the Charlton–King–Vandam Historic District. The decision to include the buildings chosen is as follows: "On Vandam Street, numbers 23, 25, 27 and 29 remain in close-to-original state. Their pitched roofs, and dormers, their delicately contrived doorways, and their iron work are appealingly representative of the Federal style."

Notable locations
SoHo Playhouse at 15 Vandam Street

Notable residents
Soprano Leontyne Price lived from 1962 until 2013 at 9 Vandam Street.

References

External links

Streets in Manhattan
Hudson Square